The National Physique Committee (NPC) is the largest amateur bodybuilding organization in the United States. Amateur bodybuilders compete in competitions from local to national competitions sanctioned by the NPC. While the term "bodybuilding" is commonly used to refer to athletes participating in contests sanctioned by the NPC and IFBB Pro League, nine divisions are represented including men's bodybuilding, women's bodybuilding, bikini, men's physique, classic physique, women's physique, figure, fitness, and wellness.

History 
The Amateur Athletic Union is an organization that governs many amateur level sports. Each sport has a committee that provides direct oversight of that sport. For the sport of bodybuilding Jim Manion was the president of the Physique Committee. Manion decided that in order to better promote the sport of bodybuilding, he would need to break away from the AAU which he did when he founded the National Physique Committee in the early 1980s.

Professional Status 
The NPC is the only amateur organization recognized by the IFBB Professional League. The IFBB Pro League is the professional league for bodybuilding athletes and the sanctioning body for the world's largest professional contests such as the Mr. Olympia, Arnold Sports Festival, and Legion Sports Fest. In order to become an IFBB professional athlete an athlete must compete at an IFBB Pro Qualifier such as the NPC Nationals Championship, NPC USA Championship, or any other pro qualifier. Professional status will be awarded to top placing athletes.

Rules 
Athletes must possess a valid NPC card to compete in an NPC show. NPC cards are valid for a calendar year.

Eligibility 
An athlete must be a citizen to compete in the following national competitions:
 Masters National Championships
 USA Championships
 Team Universe Championships
 Nationals Championships

Proof of citizenship must be one of the following:
 A birth certificate
 A voter’s registration card
 Military discharge papers
 Naturalization Papers – Form N560
 Consular Service Form FS24 for those born outside of the United States to US parents

Residency is four (4) months prior to a contest or must be a full-time student in the area.

Backstage 
 The only people permitted in the backstage area are competitors, expediters and NPC officials.
 Coaches or others may be permitted after paying for a backstage pass, along with tickets to the show.

Competitors' Health 
 Any competitor who appears to be disoriented, light-headed or experiences undue cramping will not be permitted to compete.
 Any competitor disqualified for health reasons must be checked by the attending EMT and, if it is advised by the EMT, must go to the nearest hospital for evaluation.
 Competitors who refuse to be evaluated by the EMT or at the hospital will be suspended from competition for a period of one year from the date of the occurrence.

Events 

 Men's Bodybuilding
 Classic Physique
 Men's Physique
 Fitness
 Women's Bodybuilding
 Women's Physique
 Bikini
 Figure
 Wellness

Classes 
 Open – Competitors of any age or experience
 Novice – Athletes who have never placed first in any class/age group in an NPC contest 
 True Novice – Athletes who have never competed in an NPC contest 
 Teen – The athlete must be in the age range that the promoter decides. Can range from 13–19
 Junior – The athlete must be under 23 years old or younger on the day of the event
 Master – The athlete needs to be the minimum age of the division the day of the event

Posing

Posing Suits 
(Dependent on event)
 All suit bottoms must be V-shaped, no thongs are permitted.
 Suits worn by male competitors at the prejudging and  finals must be plain in color with no fringe, wording, sparkle or fluorescents.
 Suits worn by female competitors at the Prejudging must be two-piece and plain in color with no fringe, wording, sparkle or fluorescents.
 Suits worn by female competitors at the Finals must be two-piece but may include a printed design with fringes, lace, sparkle or fluorescents that are in good taste.
 All Prejudging suits will be checked at the morning check-in.
 Competitors are not permitted to alter the fit of the posing suit by hiking it up in the back or by pulling up the sides during Front and Rear Lat Spreads.

Posing Music 
 Posing music will be used at the Finals only with the exception of Mixed Pairs competitors who will use music at both the Prejudging and the Finals.
 Posing music must be on a cassette tape or CD and must be the only music on the tape or CD.
 Posing music must be on Side A and should be cued to the start of the music.
 Posing music must not contain vulgar lyrics. Competitors using music containing vulgar lyrics will be disqualified.
 During the Prejudging male and female competitors are not permitted to wear any jewelry onstage other than a wedding band. Decorative pieces in the hair are not permitted.
 During the Finals female competitors are permitted to wear earrings.
 No glasses, props or gum are permitted onstage.
 Any competitor doing the “Moon Pose” will be disqualified.
 Lying on the floor is prohibited.
 Bumping and shoving is prohibited. First and second persons involved will be disqualified.
 Competitors numbers will be worn on the left side of the suit bottom.

Prejudging Poses

Relaxed Round 
 Keep your feet flat
 Keep your heels together
 Hold your arms at your sides
 No twisting
 Your head must be facing the same direction as your feet.

Individual Round 
 Begin when ready – no signal is necessary from the Head Judge.
 Maximum of 60 seconds with a warning when 10 seconds remain.
 You are not obligated to use all 60 seconds.
 Lying on the floor is not permitted.

Mandatory Round 
 Front Double Bicep
 Front Lat Spread
 Side Chest
 Side Triceps
 Rear Double Bicep
 Rear Lat Spread
 Abdominals and Thigh

Weight Classes 

(Only relevant to specific events)
2 Classes:
Lightweight – up to and including 125 lbs
Heavyweight – over 125 lbs

3 Classes:
Lightweight – up to and including 125 lbs
Middleweight – over 125 lbs up to and including 140 lbs
Heavyweight – over 140 lbs

4 Classes:
Lightweight – up to and including 115 lbs
Middleweight – over 115 lbs up to and including 125 lbs
Light-Heavyweight – over 125 lbs up to and including 140 lbs
Heavyweight – over 140 lbs
Lightweight – up to and including 114.5 lbs
Middleweight – over 114.5 lbs up to and including 125.5 lbs
Heavyweight – over 125.5 lbs

National Champions

Men's Overall Bodybuilding Winners 
 2018: Men's – Hunter Labrada
 2017: Men's – Chris DiDomenico
 2016: Men's – Shaun Vasquez
 2015: Men's – Sergio Oliva Jr.
 2014: Men's – Alexis Rolon
 2013: Men's – Kevin Jordan
 2012: Men's – Brian Yersky
 2011: Men's – Todd Jewell
 2010: Men's – Robert Burneika 
 2009: Men's - Cedric McMillan 
 2008: Men's - Edward Nunn 
 2007: Men's - Evan Centopani 
 2006: Men's - Desmond Miller 
 2005: Men's - William Wilmore 
 2004: Men's - Chris Cook 
 2003: Men's - Mat Duval 
 2002: Men's - Toney Freeman 
 2001: Men's - Johnnie Jackson
 2000: Men's - Victor Martinez
 1999: Men's - Aaron Maddron
 1998: Men's - Jason Arntz
 1997: Men's - Tom Prince
 1996: Men's - Willie Stalling
 1995: Men's - Don Long
 1994: Men's - Paul Demayo
 1993: Men's -  Michael Francois
 1992: Men's - John Sherman
 1991: Men's - Kevin Levrone
 1990: Men's - Alq' Gurley
 1989: Men's - Troy Zuccolotto
 1988: Men's - Vince Taylor
 1987: Men's - Shawn Ray
 1986: Men's - Gary Strydom
 1985: Men's - Phil Williams
 1984: Men's - Mike Christian
 1983: Men's - Bob Paris
 1982: Men's - Lee Haney

See also 
 Bodybuilding
 Female Bodybuilding

References

Further reading 
 The NPC News. National Physique Committee of the U.S.A. Pittsburgh, PA.

External links 
 Official website

Bodybuilding organizations